Kilian Schröcker (born 3 September 2001) is an Austrian footballer who plays as a goalkeeper for Austrian Regionalliga Salzburg club Saalfelden.

Club career
Schröcker started playing football with TUS Admont, before moving to SK Sturm Graz in 2014. In 2015, he moved to the youth team of Red Bull Salzburg and then to Liefering since 2019. 2020 he went on loan to SV Grödig in the third league. 2021 he went on to FC Pinzgau Saalfelden, also a 3rd league side.

Liefering
On 7 March 2020, he made his professional debut for Liefering in a home match against Lafnitz, ending in a 4–1.

References

External links
 

Living people
2001 births
Austrian footballers
Austria youth international footballers
Association football goalkeepers
FC Liefering players
SV Grödig players
2. Liga (Austria) players